Félix Alegría (born 20 November 1876, date of death unknown) was a Chilean sports shooter. He competed in four events at the 1912 Summer Olympics.

References

1876 births
Year of death missing
Chilean male sport shooters
Olympic shooters of Chile
Shooters at the 1912 Summer Olympics
People from Linares Province
20th-century Chilean people